Aslockton is a civil parish in the Rushcliffe district of Nottinghamshire, England.  The parish contains two listed buildings that are recorded in the National Heritage List for England.  Both the listed buildings are designated at Grade II, the lowest of the three grades, which is applied to "buildings of national importance and special interest".  The parish contains the village of Aslockton and the surrounding countryside.  Both the listed buildings are in the village, and consist of a railway platform shelter and a church.


Buildings

References

Citations

Sources

 

Lists of listed buildings in Nottinghamshire